Valentina Tserbe-Nessina (born 8 January 1969) is a Ukrainian biathlete. 
At the 1994 Winter Olympics in Lillehammer, she won a bronze medal in the 7.5 km sprint, and finished 5th with the Ukrainian relay team.

She finished 5th with the Ukraine relay team at the 1998 Winter Olympics in Nagano.

References

1969 births
Living people
Ukrainian female biathletes
Biathletes at the 1994 Winter Olympics
Biathletes at the 1998 Winter Olympics
Olympic biathletes of Ukraine
Medalists at the 1994 Winter Olympics
Olympic medalists in biathlon
Olympic bronze medalists for Ukraine
Biathlon World Championships medalists
Sportspeople from Zhytomyr Oblast